Theodor Constantin Botă (born 24 May 1997 in Râmnicu Vâlcea) is a Romanian professional footballer who plays as striker.

Career statistics

Club

Statistics accurate as of match played 17 November 2017

References

External links
 

Living people
1997 births
Romanian footballers
Liga I players
FC Steaua București players
Liga II players
FC Steaua II București players
Romania youth international footballers
Association football forwards
Sportspeople from Râmnicu Vâlcea